The Women's 400m Individual Medley event at the 2003 Pan American Games took place on August 12, 2003 (Day 11 of the Games). The defending Pan Am champion from 1999, Canada's Joanne Malar, was in the event.

Medalists

Records

Results

Notes

References
usaswimming

Medley, Women's 400m
2003 in women's swimming
Swim